The Polish American Football Association or shortly PZFA is the national American football association in Poland and was founded in November 2004.

The PZFA is a full member of the International and European federations.

History
The PZFA was created in November 2004, initiated by the first two American football teams: Warsaw Eagles and 1. KFA Wielkopolska (now Fireballs Wielkopolska). Its founding, was a response to the dynamic growth of the American football movement in Poland.

In October 2006, Eagles, Fireballs, Pomorze Seahawks and The Crew Wrocław, create the Polish American Football League (PLFA). Short season was won by the Eagles who beat the Seahawks in the Polish Bowl I.

The second league, PLFA II, was created in the 2008 PLFA season. In the 2011 PLFA season was founded eight-man football league, PLFA 8. In the 2012 PLFA season was founded junior league (14–17 years old), PLFA J and 15 Polish team gets 400 complete sets of equipment for junior players.

See also
Polish American Football League

References

External links
 (en) (pl) Official website

American football in Poland
American football
Poland
Organizations established in 2004
2004 establishments in Poland
Polish American Football League